"Dum Da Dum" is a 1993 Eurodance/hip hop song by Swedish recording artist Melodie MC, released as his third single from his debut album, Northland Wonderland (1993). It contains a sample from the 1990 song "Feel That Beat" by 2 Static and features vocals by Mayomi (aka Pia Sjöberg). In Europe, it was very successful on the charts, peaking at number two in Greece, number three in Spain, number four in the Netherlands and number seven in Sweden. Additionally, it reached number 16 in Denmark and number 18 in Belgium. On the Eurochart Hot 100, it was a top 20 hit, reaching number 13. Outside Europe, the single enjoyed success in Australia, where it hit number five and was certified gold. And in Israel, it peaked at number 13. A music video was produced to promote the single. In 2009, a new version was released as "Dum Da Dum '09".

Critical reception
James Hamilton from Music Weeks RM Dance Update described it as a "commercial cornily rapped Swedish Euro-hit". 

Track listing
 12", Sweden (1993)"Dum Da Dum" (Club Version) – 6:10
"Dum Da Dum" (Radio Version) – 4:23
"Dum Da Dum" (Alternative Club by N Brigade) – 5:01

 CD single, Europe (1993)"Dum Da Dum" (Radio Version) – 4:41
"Dum Da Dum" (Club Version) – 6:15

 CD maxi, Europe (1993)'
"Dum Da Dum" (Radio Version) – 4:41
"Dum Da Dum" (Club Version) – 6:15
"Dum Da Dum" (Alternative Club by N Brigade) – 6:51
"Feel Your Body Movin' 93" (Toms Transquality Mix) – 6:03

Charts

Weekly charts

Year-end charts

Certifications

References

1993 singles
1993 songs
English-language Swedish songs
Eurodance songs